The mustard plant is any one of several plant species in the genera Brassica and Sinapis in the family Brassicaceae (the mustard family). Mustard seed is used as a spice. Grinding and mixing the seeds with water, vinegar, or other liquids creates the yellow condiment known as prepared mustard. The seeds can also be pressed to make mustard oil, and the edible leaves can be eaten as mustard greens.  Many vegetables are cultivated varieties of mustard plants; domestication may have begun 6,000 years ago.

History

Although some varieties of mustard plants were well-established crops in Hellenistic and Roman times, Zohary and Hopf note, "There are almost no archeological records available for any of these crops." Wild forms of mustard and its relatives, the radish and turnip, can be found over West Asia and Europe, suggesting their domestication took place somewhere in that area. However, Zohary and Hopf conclude: "Suggestions as to the origins of these plants are necessarily based on linguistic considerations." The Encyclopædia Britannica states that mustard was grown by the Indus Civilization of 2500–1700 BC. According to the Saskatchewan Mustard Development Commission, "Some of the earliest known documentation of mustard's use dates back to Sumerian and Sanskrit texts from 3000 BC".

A wide-ranging genetic study of B. rapa announced in 2021 concluded that the species may have been domesticated as long as 6,000 years ago in Central Asia, and that turnips or oilseeds may have been the first product.  The results also suggested that a taxonomic re-evaluation of the species might be needed.

Species

White mustard (Sinapis alba) grows wild in North Africa, West Asia, and Mediterranean Europe, and has spread farther by long cultivation; brown mustard (Brassica juncea), originally from the foothills of the Himalayas, is grown commercially in India, Canada, the United Kingdom, Denmark, Bangladesh and the United States; black mustard (Brassica nigra) is grown in Argentina, Chile, the US, and some European countries. Canada and Nepal are the world's major producers of mustard seed, between them accounting for around 57% of world production in 2010. White mustard is commonly used as a cover crop in Europe (between UK and Ukraine). Many varieties exist, e.g., in Germany and the Netherlands, mainly differing in lateness of flowering and resistance against white beet-cyst nematode (Heterodera schachtii). Farmers prefer late-flowering varieties, which do not produce seeds; they may become weeds in the subsequent year. Early vigor is important to cover the soil quickly and suppress weeds and protect the soil against erosion. In rotations with sugar beets, suppression of the white beet-cyst nematode is an important trait. Resistant white mustard varieties reduce nematode populations by 70–90%.

Recent research has studied varieties of mustards with high oil contents for use in the production of biodiesel, a renewable liquid fuel similar to diesel fuel. The biodiesel made from mustard oil has good flow properties and cetane ratings. The leftover meal after pressing out the oil has also been found to be an effective pesticide.

A genetic relationship between many species of mustard, along with turnips, cabbage, horseradish, wasabi and their respective derivatives, has been observed and is described as the triangle of U.

Gallery

See also
 Green manure
 List of mustard brands

References

External links

Brassica
Edible nuts and seeds
Leaf vegetables
Medicinal plants
Plant common names